In the run up to the 2017 Norwegian parliamentary election, various organisations carried out opinion polling to gauge voting intention in Norway. Results of such polls are displayed in this article.

The date range for these opinion polls are from the previous parliamentary election, held on 8 and 9 September 2013, to the day the next election was held, on 11 September 2017. Unlike most nations, Norway's constitution does not allow early elections before the four-year term limit.

Opinion polls

Graphical summary

Vote share

See also
Opinion polling for the 2021 Norwegian parliamentary election

Norway
2017